The 1920 Antrim County Council election was held on Thursday, 3 June 1920.

Council results

Division results

Antrim Electoral Division
Composed of the former districts of Antrim Rural, Ballycare Rural, Ballynaorentagh, Ballyrobin, Ballygillan, Cargin, Carnmoney, Connor, Craigarogan, Cranfield, Crumlin, Donegore, Drumanaway, Dundesert, Glenavy, Kilbride, Randalstown, Rashee, Seacash, Sharvogue, Shilvodan, Templepatrick, Toome, Urban District of Ballycare, Town of Antrim.

Ballymena Electoral Division
Composed of the former districts of Ballymena, Ahoghoil, Kells, Glen Rm, Galgorm, and Killoquin.

Ballymoney Electoral Division

Carrickfergus Electoral Division
Composed of the former districts of Ballycor, Ballylinney, Ballynure, Cairncastle, Carrick, Fergus Rural, Eden, Glenwherry, Glynn, Islandmagee, Kilwaughter, Monkstown, Raloo, Temple Corran, Whiteabbey, Whitehouse, and urban districts of Carrickfergus and Larne.

In Carrickfergus the defeat of Edward Coey, an active member of Edward Carson's Advisory Committee, was an unexpected loss. Coey had been a member of the council since the first elections in 1899.

Lisburn Electoral Division

References

1920 Irish local elections
1920